Christopher David Hatton (born 15 April 1957) is a former Australian politician who was a Liberal Party member of the Legislative Assembly of Western Australia from 2013 to 2017, representing the seat of Balcatta.

Hatton was born in Perth. He worked as a schoolteacher before entering politics, teaching both in the country and at metropolitan schools. Hatton first ran for parliament at the 2008 state election, standing against John Kobelke (the Labor incumbent) in Balcatta. He polled 47.7 percent of the two-party-preferred vote, a positive swing of 6.9 points from the previous election. 

Hatton ran again at the 2013 election, at which Kobelke retired. Balcatta had been one of the most marginal seats prior to the election, and fell to the Liberals after a 9.5-point swing in Hatton's favour. He was defeated in 2017.

References

Living people
1957 births
Members of the Western Australian Legislative Assembly
Politicians from Perth, Western Australia
Liberal Party of Australia members of the Parliament of Western Australia
Australian schoolteachers
21st-century Australian politicians